The following lists the top 25 singles of 2006  in Australia from the Australian Recording Industry Association (ARIA) End of Year singles chart.

"I Wish I Was a Punk Rocker (With Flowers in My Hair)" by Sandi Thom was the biggest song of the year, peaking at No. 1 for ten weeks and staying in the top 50 for 34 weeks, this song was also the longest number one of the year.

*1 week in 2005, and 4 in 2006**3 weeks in 2007***2 weeks in 2005****1 week in 2005*****1 week in 2007******2 weeks in 2005

Notes

References

Australian record charts
2006 in Australian music
Australia Top 25 singles